Maroochydore is a coastal town in the Sunshine Coast Region, Queensland, Australia. 

The town was subdivided from the Cotton Tree reserve by Surveyor Thomas O'Connor in 1903. The land was acquired from William Pettigrew who had a timber depot at what is now Wharf Street. Its name comes from the Yuggera language word Muru-kutchi, meaning red-bill and referring to the black swan, which is commonly seen in the area.

Maroochydore is a major commercial area of the Sunshine Coast with most shopping precincts located in the central business district. It is home to the Sunshine Plaza shopping centre and the Sunshine Coast's major bus interchange for TransLink services operated by Sunbus. Maroochydore is also a venue of major surf sport carnivals, and is a popular holiday point from which to travel the rest of Queensland.

Geography

The boundaries of the Maroochydore as a locality are well-defined. As a town, Maroochydore does not have strict boundaries, but the boundary used by Sunshine Coast Regional Council (formerly the Maroochy Shire) includes a region from the southern boundary of Sunshine Coast Airport to the Mooloolah River at Mooloolaba and Kawana Way. This corresponds to the historic Australian Bureau of Statistics urban centres of Maroochydore–Mooloolaba and Mudjimba. The central business district (CBD) for the area is located on Horton Parade, Maroochydore.

The Maroochydore urban centre consists of Alexandra Headland, part of Bli Bli, Buderim (section within about one km of Sunshine Motorway), Cotton Tree (Australia Post 4558), Kuluin, Maroochydore, Maroochy Waters, Maroochy River, Mooloolaba, Mountain Creek, Mudjimba, Pacific Paradise and Twin Waters.

The current ASGC, applicable to the 2001 and 2006 censuses, has placed all of Buderim and Mountain Creek under the Buderim SLA.

Maroochy Waters
Maroochy Waters is a waterfront, residential estate located in Maroochydore adjacent to the Maroochy River in Queensland, Australia. It is one of the last canal projects to be built in Queensland with direct access to the river system and the Coral Sea. Sunshine Coast Region Council has an annual dredging program to replenish the sand beaches.

The canals plus all infrastructure were built in three stages in the late 1970s, mid 1980s, and the early 1990s. The deep water canal plays a role in flood relief and the land is higher than Maroochydore CBD which has recorded floods in the last 30 years. The canal's main reach, which extends for more than one km, was the training ground for 1992 Olympic K-1 1000 m gold medalist Clint Robinson.

History 
Maroochydore Post Office opened on 4 October 1922 (a receiving office had been open from 1891 until 1898, and from 1916).

Our Lady Star of the Sea (Stella Maris) Catholic Church was officially opened by Archbishop James Duhig on Sunday 15 October 1950. It replaced an earlier church which had become inadequate for the growing congregation. The 1950 church could seat 170 people in the nave and a further 150 people on the verandahs on either side of the church. Timber from the recently demolished St Joseph's Catholic Church in Nambour was used to construct the Maroochydore church to reduce the costs. The architect was Frank Cullen and the contractor was K. D. Morris.

The Maroochydore Library opened in 1975.

Horton Park Golf Club is in Maroochydore. The club relocated to Bli Bli in May 2015 and changed names to Maroochy River Golf Club.

The relocation of the golf course allowed the Sunshine Regional Council to develop the old golf course into a new city centre for the region known as Sunshine Central.

The redevelopment is next to Sunshine Cove, a new sustainable residential and commercial development that has revitalized the general town centre and the development won the award from the Urban Development Institute of Australia for the best residential property Development at its annual Australian awards night in 2016.

Heritage listings
Cotton Tree has a number of heritage-listed sites, including:
 Cotton Tree Parade: Cotton Tree Caravan Park

Transport
Maroochydore's suburbs are served by Sunbus, who operate from outside the Sunshine Plaza in the CBD. Various bus routes connect Maroochydore to Buderim, Coolum, Kawana Waters, Caloundra, Nambour and Noosa.

Maroochydore is accessible via train and connecting bus via Nambour, Woombye and Landsborough stations on the Nambour & Gympie North Line has regular services to Brisbane, operated by Queensland Rail. There are also coach services from Sunshine Plaza to Brisbane Airport.

Sunshine Coast Airport is located just north of the urban centre in Marcoola. It offers domestic flights to state capital cities around Australia.

There are plans to create a new railway line that would extend from the current Gympie North line. The proposed line would connect Caloundra, Kawana Waters and Maroochydore with Brisbane and would terminate at the Sunshine Coast Airport. A light rail system has also been proposed, which would leave from the Maroochydore CBD and connect the local regional hubs before terminating at Caloundra.

Population

Census populations for the Maroochydore urban centre have been recorded since 1933, and for Mudjimba since 1981.

Amenities 
Sunshine Coast Regional Council operates a public library at 44 Sixth Avenue, Cotton Tree.

The Maroochydore branch of the Queensland Country Women's Association meets at 104 Memorial Avenue.

Education
The main state secondary school in the town is Maroochydore State High School (1964). Other schools in the area include:

 Bli Bli State School (1901)
 Kuluin State School (1987)
 Maroochydore State School (1921)
 Mooloolaba State School (1933)
 Mountain Creek State School (1994)
 Mountain Creek State High School (1995)
 Pacific Paradise State School (1992)
 Immanuel Lutheran College (1982)
 Stella Maris Catholic Primary School (1980)
Siena Catholic College (1997)

Media 
Along with a number of other regional Australian newspapers owned by NewsCorp, the Kawana/Maroochy Weekly newspaper ceased publication in June 2020.

Sport

All four football codes are popular in Maroochydore. The Maroochydore Multi Sports Complex is home to both the AFL and soccer and has hosted AFL Women's premiership matches and AFL pre-season matches. The Maroochydore Australian Football Club (Roos) (founded 1969) competes in the Queensland Australian Football League (QAFL) competition, the state's premier semi-professional level and also fields women's and junior sides. The Maroochydore Football Club (Swans) (founded 1968) play in the Football Queensland Premier League 2 and also fields women's and junior sides. The Maroochydore Rugby League Club (Swans) (founded 1972) competes in the Sunshine Coast Gympie Rugby League and also fields women's and junior sides. The Maroochydore Rugby Union (Swans) (founded 1974) competes in the Sunshine Coast Rugby Union competition and also fields junior sides.

Cricket is also popular and the Maroochydore Cricket Club is based at Elizabeth Daniels Park.

In popular culture 
Maroochydore is the sixth town mentioned in the original (Australian) version of the song "I've Been Everywhere".

See also

Maroochy air crash

References

External links

 University of Queensland: Queensland Places: Maroochydore

 
1903 establishments in Australia
Populated places established in 1903
Coastline of Queensland
Tourism in Queensland
Suburbs of the Sunshine Coast Region